is a Japanese footballer who plays as a winger or forward for J2 League club Mito Hollyhock, on loan from Kashiwa Reysol.

Career statistics

Club
.

References

External links

2001 births
Living people
Sportspeople from Chiba Prefecture
Association football people from Chiba Prefecture
Japanese footballers
Association football wingers
Association football forwards
J1 League players
J2 League players
Kashiwa Reysol players
Mito HollyHock players